Gage Airport  is a town owned, public use airport located two nautical miles (4 km) southwest of the central business district of Gage, a town in Ellis County, Oklahoma, United States. It is included in the National Plan of Integrated Airport Systems for 2011–2015, which categorized it as a general aviation facility.

Facilities and aircraft 
Gage Airport covers an area of 780 acres (316 ha) at an elevation of 2,223 feet (678 m) above mean sea level. It has one runway designated 17/35 with an asphalt surface measuring 5,415 by 100 feet (1,650 x 30 m).

For the 12-month period ending June 2, 2011, the airport had 200 general aviation aircraft operations, an average of 16 per month. At that time there were 7 aircraft based at this airport, all ultralight.

References

External links 
 Gage Airport (GAG) at Oklahoma Aeronautics Commission
 Aerial image as of March 1996 from USGS The National Map

Airports in Oklahoma
Buildings and structures in Ellis County, Oklahoma